Azhar Muhammad Usman (born December 23, 1975) is an American comedian, actor, screenwriter, and producer of Indian descent. He is a former lecturer, community activist and lawyer and has been referred to as the "Ayatollah of Comedy" and "Bin Laughin". He is best known as one third of comedy trio Allah Made Me Funny. In December 2020, Marvel Studios announced that Usman had joined the Marvel Cinematic Universe, agreeing to play Najaf on the cast of the studio's Ms. Marvel original streaming series for Disney+.

Early life 
Usman was born in Chicago, Illinois, to immigrant Indian Muslim parents. As a child, his family lived in the predominately Jewish Chicago suburb of Skokie. In the 1970s, Usman's veterinarian father Zia Usman (a graduate of Aligarh Muslim University) and school-teacher mother Atiya Usman left Bihar, India, and emigrated to the United States.

In 1993, Usman graduated from Niles West High School in Skokie, Illinois. In 1996, he graduated with a BA degree in Communication and Spanish from the University of Illinois at Chicago, and in 1999 a Juris Doctor from the University of Minnesota Law School. He co-founded an Internet startup, then practiced law, and then started performing stand-up comedy.

He chose not to practice law after graduating from law school. Instead he did a dot-com start-up. He turned down six-figure salary offers to pay himself $35,000 working for his own dot com. He then folded the dot-com business and started practicing law briefly as a solo practitioner, whilst doing stand up as a hobby.

Stand-up career 
Since 1996, Usman had a friend who was an amateur comic and he would take him to a comedy club in Minneapolis. This inspired him to write an act in 2000. Usman started performing stand-up comedy in early 2001, a few months before September 11, initially as a hobby. However, in 2004, he had enough bookings to make a run at it. In early 2004, Usman stopped practicing law full-time. He has performed in many major cities in the U.S. as well as in over 20 countries on five continents.

In May 2004, Usman along with Preacher Moss and Azeem Muhammad (later replaced by Mohammed Amer in 2006) launched a comedy tour titled Allah Made Me Funny. He also co-wrote and produced a feature-length documentary/concert film based on the live tour, which was theatrically exhibited at Landmark Theatres in over a dozen top US markets in 2008. The film was directed by award-winning documentarian Andrea Kalin and funded by the Unity Productions Foundation. Allah Made Me Funny toured 30 U.S. cities during its first year, and also in Canada, Europe, Malaysia, Australia, New Zealand, South Africa, and the Middle East.

He has performed in 23 countries on five different continents. Usman and his comedy have been covered by over 100 major world media outlets, including The New York Times, The Economist, CBS Sunday Morning, CNN Headline News, and a whole episode of ABC Nightline. He has played original sketch comedy characters for MTV Networks, E4, and he was the creator and star of his own short-lived, semi-scripted, alternative web comedy show Tinku's World. He performed at Global Peace and Unity Event in the ExCeL Exhibition Centre in London. He also appeared in the independent film Mooz-lum. He has shared the stage with comedians including Dave Chappelle, Jim Gaffigan, Russell Peters, Todd Barry and Mitch Hedberg.

In 2008, CNN aired an hour-long special, entitled America's Funniest Muslim, on its Turkish affiliate, which included both performance clips and an extended Q&A session with Usman. In November 2008, he toured India, debuting at the American Center in New Delhi.

Film career 
Usman and Matt Sunbulli founded a production company called 9 Saints. (now defunct). In 2008, Usman produced a short film, The Boundary (directed by Julius Onah), which was selected as a finalist by the HBO Short Film Competition, and aired on that network several times. Usman also appeared in the critically acclaimed, independent feature film Mooz-lum (directed by Qasim "Q" Basir) in 2011, starring opposite Roger Guenveur Smith, Evan Ross, Nia Long, and film legend Danny Glover. He also appeared in several documentaries as himself, including It's My Country Too: Muslim Americans (directed by Ruhi Hamid for BBC), Me and the Mosque (directed by Zarqa Nawaz for CBC), and STANDUP: Muslim American Comics Come of Age (directed by Glenn Baker for PBS).

Television career 
In June 2013, Usman featured on an interfaith special, What's So Funny About Religion?, alongside Lewis Black and Mohammed Amer, which was broadcast on the CBS Television Network.

In February 2017, Usman appeared in the recurring role of Kkyman Candahar in the Amazon original series Patriot, created, written, and directed by Chicago screenwriter and producer Steven Conrad. He returned the following year to reprise his role in the second season of the show.

In 2018, he served as a Creative Advisor on the Hulu original series RAMY, created by and starring Egyptian-American standup comedian and actor, Ramy Youssef. In 2019, he served as an Executive Creative Advisor on the show's second season, as well as a staff writer, and co-wrote an episode of the show, co-starring Egyptian screen legend Amr Waked and two-time Academy Award winner Mahershala Ali, with the show's eponymous creator.

In December 2020, Usman was cast in an undisclosed role in the Disney+ streaming series Ms. Marvel, set in the Marvel Cinematic Universe.

Comedy style 
Usman talks about family histories and his American-Muslim childhood. He jokes about being mistaken for a terrorist, customs, religious holidays, families and himself.

Usman's character comedy includes "Sheikh Abdul, the radical imam", who intersperses vitriolic lectures with announcements about double-parked cars and meetings to re-elect the mosque committee that has remained unchanged for 37 years. There is also "Uncle Letmesplainyou", an antique Muslim who barely speaks English, has crazy political views and a voracious desire to share them, elbowing others aside to embarrass the community in television interviews. He also brags about the growth of Muslim America to people who don't care.

Other activities 
Usman is an artist and an activist and was a co-founding board member and director of The Nawawi Foundation, an Illinois non-profit dedicated to contemporary Islamic research and private Muslim think tank.

Usman serves as an Arts and Culture advisor to the Inner-City Muslim Action Network (IMAN) in Chicago. He also runs a boutique law practice.

Usman wrote a one-man show titled "Ultra American: A Patriot Act starring Azhar Usman" and premiered it at Silk Road Rising in Chicago in September 2016. The show was recommended for a Jeff Award.

In May 2017, Usman appeared on comedian Pete Holmes' podcast You Made It Weird, for a wide-ranging interview that covered many topics.

In the beginning of 2020, he announced the formation of Numinous Company, a boutique services firm offering creative producing and humor consulting services to fellow creatives, such as comedians and creators, startups, non-profits, and other clients.

Awards and recognition 
In March 2005, ABC Nightline ran an entire episode about Usman called "MUSLIM COMIC." In 2008, CNN's Turkish affiliate (CNN Türk) ran a one-hour special starring Usman, entitled "America's Funniest Muslim," which included a portion of live standup, followed by a lengthy Q&A session with the audience. In 2009, Usman was listed as one of The 500 Most Influential Muslims by Georgetown University's The Prince Alwaleed Center for Muslim–Christian Understanding and Royal Islamic Strategic Studies Centre of Jordan.  In 2010, fellow comedian and legendary standup icon Dave Chappelle remarked: "Azhar Usman is untouchable, he's like a comedian from the future," after a show at The New Parish in Oakland, California. Usman has opened for Chappelle over 40 times since first meeting him in 2005.

Filmography

Film

Television

Theatre

Personal life 
Usman is an Indian American Sufi Muslim. He is divorced with four children. His ex-wife is a lawyer. In the Spring of 2020, it was announced on his personal Instagram account that he is now married to visual artist Jennifer Hoffman Usman (f/k/a Jen Jackson), a graduate of The Prince's School of the Traditional Arts.

See also 
Allah Made Me Funny
Islamic humour
Indian American
Islamic Neo-Traditionalism
List of American Muslims
List of Indian Americans

References

External links 

Numinous Company

Further reading 
BBC interview with Azhar Usman
Jalil, Jannat. Muslim comedians laugh at racism. BBC News. June 15, 2004
PBS on Azhar Usman. Religion & Ethics NewsWeekly. September 15, 2006
Rahman, Emdad. Interview with Azhar Usman. Mathaba. February 26, 2007
Manzoor, Sarfraz. Funny old world. The Guardian. April 6, 2007
Ali, Wajahat. "Allah made me funny" comedy tour: "We're trying to bring an expression about us, to us, from us". Patheos. October 25, 2007
Khan, Yasmeen. Does Islam have a sense of humour?. BBC News. Tuesday, 20 November 2007
Lall, Rashmee Roshan. Meet Azhar Usman, the 'bin Laughing' from Bihar.  The Times of India. December 1, 2007
Amanullah, Shahed. Comedian Azhar Usman: Allah made him funny. Patheos. October 3, 2008
Kaitlin. Comedians Break Muslim Stereotypes. Inside Islam. October 15, 2008
Naim, Anjum. Azhar Usman : Allah Made Me Funny. Span. January/February 2009
Kieran, Fox, Muslim comedy trio take on UK. BBC News. April 17, 2009
Vandersteen, Victoria. Azhar Usman: "Never imagined becoming a comedian". Indymedia.be. 19 October 2009
Comedian-activist Azhar Usman to keynote 'Nonviolence in the Islamic Traditions' conference here Saturday. Bulletin today. University of St. Thomas. Wednesday, April 6, 2011
Abrams, Abby. Take five: American Muslim comedian makes people laugh by telling the truth. St. Louis Beacon. August 21, 2012

21st-century American comedians
American stand-up comedians
American comedians of Indian descent
Muslim male comedians
American Sufis
American male actors of Indian descent
American male film actors
21st-century American male actors
Illinois lawyers
Writers from Chicago
Male actors from Chicago
University of Illinois Chicago alumni
University of Minnesota Law School alumni
Allah Made Me Funny
Comedians from Illinois
1975 births
Living people